Tao Yuan may refer to:

 Tao Yuan (Shaman King), a Shaman King character who is the father of Tao Ren and Tao Jun, a powerful shaman
 Tao Yuan (footballer) (born 1993), Chinese footballer

See also
Taoyuan (disambiguation), various places in Mainland China and Taiwan